Vitt or VITT may refer to:

 Vitt, a village in Germany on the Baltic Sea island of Ruegen
 William T. Vitt House (Vitt House), Washington, Franklin County, Missouri, USA; an NRHP-listed building
 Vitt (surname)
 Vaccine-induced immune thrombotic thrombocytopenia

See also

 VIT (disambiguation)